Kallikrein-related peptidase 7 (KLK7) is a serine protease that in humans is encoded by the KLK7 gene. KLK7 was initially purified from the epidermis and characterised as stratum corneum chymotryptic enzyme (SCCE). It was later identified as the seventh member of the human kallikrein family, which includes fifteen homologous serine proteases located on chromosome 19 (19q13).

Gene 
Alternative splicing of the KLK7 gene results in two transcript variants encoding the same protein.

Function 
KLK7 is secreted as an inactive zymogen in the stratum granulosum layer of the epidermis, requiring proteolytic cleavage of the short N-terminal pro-region to liberate activated enzyme. This may be performed by KLK5 or matriptase, which are in vitro activators of KLK7.

Once active, KLK7 is able to cleave desmocollin and corneodesmosin. These proteins constitute the extracellular component of corneodesmosomes, intercellular cohesive structures which link the intermediate filaments of adjacent cells in the stratum corneum. Proteolysis of corneodesmosomes is required for desquamation, the shedding of corneocytes from the outer layer of the epidermis. This indicates a role for KLK7 in maintaining skin homeostasis. For example, KLK7 expression is highly downregulated at acral surfaces where desquamation is delayed and the epidermis is thick.

Both KLK5 and KLK14, other skin-expressed proteases, also cleave corneodesmosomal proteins. KLK5 is able to undergo autoactivation, as well as activating KLK7 and KLK14, suggesting a KLK skin cascade is responsible for coordinating desquamation.

KLK7 activity is regulated by a number of endogenous protein inhibitors including LEKTI, SPINK6, elafin and alpha-2-Macroglobulin-like 1. Both Zn2+ and Cu2+ ions are also able to inhibit KLK7.

KLK7 is a chymotrypsin-like serine protease, preferring to cleave proteins at the residues tyrosine, phenylalanine or leucine. Analysis of peptide substrate hydrolysis indicates a strong preference for tyrosine at P1.

Clinical significance

Skin disease
Dysregulation of KLK7 has been linked to several skin disorders including atopic dermatitis, psoriasis and Netherton syndrome. These diseases are characterised by excessively dry, scaly and inflamed skin, due to a disruption of skin homeostasis and correct barrier function.

Cancer
Overexpression of KLK7 may provide a route for metastasis in ovarian, breast, pancreatic, cervix, and melanoma cancers by excessive cleavage of cell junction proteins. It may also be underexpressed in lung cancer.

References

Further reading

External links 
 The MEROPS online database for peptidases and their inhibitors: S01.017

EC 3.4.21